was a Japanese daimyō of the early Edo period. His court title was Musashi no Kami. Terumasa was also known by the nickname saigoku no shōgun, or, "The Shōgun of Western Japan". Terumasa fought in many of the battles of the late Azuchi–Momoyama period, and due to his service at the Battle of Sekigahara, received a fief at Himeji. His childhood name was Araokojimaru (荒尾古新丸). He was the son of Ikeda Tsuneoki and brother of Ikeda Sen.

Biography
Terumasa was the 2nd son and heir of Ikeda Nobuteru, Terumasa held Ikejiri Castle (Mino Province) and joined his father in fighting for Hideyoshi in the Battle of Komaki and Nagakute 1584, he led troops at Nagakute, the battle in which his father was killed.

In 1590, following the transfer of Tokugawa Ieyasu to the Kanto, Terumasa was established at Yoshida in Mikawa, a 152,000-koku fief. In 1594 Terumasa married one of Tokugawa's daughters, and after Hideyoshi's death in 1598, the Ikeda drifted into Ieyasu's camp.

When the Sekigahara Campaign began in the fall of 1600, Terumasa immediately sided with his father-in-law, Tokugawa. On 28 September he competed with Fukushima Masanori to be the first to attack Gifu Castle, held by Oda Hidenobu. At the Battle of Sekigahara, Ikeda commanded 4,560 troops in the rear guard and saw some desultory fighting with Chosokabe Morichika's contingent as the battle wound down.

Following the Tokugawa victory, Terumasa was given a 520,000-koku fief and the province of Harima. He expanded the Himeji Castle, which he completed in 1609. In 1603 Bizen was added to Terumasa's territory, and this he assigned to his eldest son, Toshitaka (1584–1616).

Death

By the time of Terumasa's death in 1613, the Ikeda had grown to rule over Harima, Bizen, Inaba, and Awaji, with a combined income of around 1,000,000-koku. Following the death of Toshitaka, the Tokugawa Bakufu took steps to reduce the alarming power of the Ikeda and eventually reduced the family to Tottori (Inaba) and Okayama (Bizen).

Ōkanehira sword

Ōkanehira or Great Kanehira, refers to the extraordinary size of the katana's blade. Work of Kanehira from Bizen Province, owned by Ikeda Terumasa and passed down in the Ikeda clan.

Family

 Father: Ikeda Tsuneoki
 Mother: Zen'ōin
Sister: Ikeda Sen
 Wives:
 Itohime, daughter of Nakagawa Kiyohide
Tokuhime (Tokugawa)
 Concubines:
 Manganin
 Daughter of Ando clan
 Children:
 Ikeda Toshitaka (1584–1616) by Itohime
 Ikeda Tadatsugu (1599–1615) by Tokuhime (Tokugawa)
 Ikeda Teruzumi (1604–1662) by Tokuhime (Tokugawa)
 Ikeda Masatsuna (1605–1631) by Tokuhime (Tokugawa)
 Ikeda Tadakatsu (1602–1632) by Tokuhime (Tokugawa)
 Ikeda Teruoki (1611–1647) by Tokuhime (Tokugawa)
 Chacha-hime married Kyogoku Takahiro by Tokuhime (Tokugawa)
 Furihime (1607–1659) married Date Tadamune by Tokuhime (Tokugawa)
 Ikeda Masatora (1590–1635) by Manganin
 Ikeda Toshimasa (1594–1639) by daughter of Ando clan
 Ikeda Terutaka

References

 Japanese Wikipedia article on Terumasa (23 October 2007)

Further reading 

1565 births
1613 deaths
Daimyo
Ikeda clan
Deified Japanese people